Granville Football Club was a 19th-century football club based at Myrtle Park, in Crosshill, Glasgow.

History

The club was officially founded in 1872 as a football playing division of the Granville Cricket Club.  However the club's first match had already taken place, with Queen's Park beating a Granville side 1-0 in November 1871; six Queen's Park men made up the numbers for Granville.

By 1873 the club had 80 members, which made it nearly as big as Queen's Park, and in April 1872 the club was the first Scottish side to avoid defeat to Queen's Park, with a 0-0 draw.  Along with Queen's Park, Granville was one of the founder members of the Scottish Football Association.

The club entered the first Scottish Cup in 1873–74 season.  The club had an unlucky draw, away to the eventual finalists Clydesdale, and lost 6-0. The team did not play in subsequent tournaments.

Granville dissolved in 1878.

Notable players

Granville F.C. is also noted for fielding a player in the first ever official international football match in 1872, namely William Ker, in a 0–0 draw at Hamilton Crescent.

Colours
The club's colours were red, black, and white striped jerseys and stockings.

References

External links
Scottish Football Club Directory
RSSSF: Scottish Cup
RSSSF: Scottish Internationals
England Football Online

Defunct football clubs in Scotland
Football clubs in Glasgow
Association football clubs established in 1872
Association football clubs disestablished in 1878
1872 establishments in Scotland
1878 disestablishments in Scotland
Scottish Football Association founder members
Govanhill and Crosshill